The 1981 Elon Fightin' Christians football team was an American football team that represented Elon University of Elon, North Carolina, as a member of the South Atlantic Conference (SAC) during the 1981 NAIA Division I football season. In their fifth and final year under head coach Jerry Tolley, the Christians compiled an 11–1–1 record (6–1 against SAC opponents) and won the SAC championship.

Schedule

References

External links
 Elon University film on the 1980-81 seasons

Elon
Elon Phoenix football seasons
NAIA Football National Champions
Elon Fightin' Christians football